Lemonstown Motte is a motte and National Monument located in County Wicklow, Ireland.

Location

Lemonstown Motte is located halfway between Dunlavin and Hollywood. The Toor Brook flows  to the east.

History
The motte was built in the Norman period, i.e. the 12th or 13th century AD.

Description
Lemonstown Motte is round,  in diameter, with an entrance to the north.

References

Archaeological sites in County Wicklow
National Monuments in County Wicklow